William Joe (born October 14, 1940) is a former American football player and coach.

Playing career
Joe was the American Football League Rookie of the Year in 1963 with the AFL's Denver Broncos. In 1965, he was traded to the Buffalo Bills for their legendary fullback, Cookie Gilchrist, and made the AFL All-Star Team, starting for the Bills in their 1965 AFL Championship victory over the San Diego Chargers.

Coaching career
Before becoming a head coach, his tenure as an assistant coach included a year at Maryland in 1971, making him the first African-American coach in the Atlantic Coast Conference.

Joe later was a successful college head coach for 33 seasons. He coached at Cheyney University of Pennsylvania from 1972 to 1978, Central State University from 1981 to 1993, Florida A&M University from 1994 to 2004, and Miles College from 2008 to 2010. Joe achieved his greatest success at Central State, where his teams won
two NAIA National Football Championships, in 1990 and 1992, and made many appearances in the NAIA football playoffs during the 1980s and 1990s. He teams at Florida A&M have made various appearances in the Division I-AA (now FCS) playoffs during the 1990s and early 2000s.

In addition, Joe has won five straight black college football national championships with Central State University (1986–1990) and one with Florida A&M (1998). In 2007, he was inducted into the College Football Hall of Fame as a coach.

Players coached by Joe who went on to the NFL/CFL/Arena League are:

Central State University: Vince Buck, Vince Heflin, Erik Williams and Hugh Douglas
Florida A&M: Jamie Brown, Jamie Nails, Terry Mickens, Dexter Nottage, Wally Williams, Earl Holmes, Robert Wilson, Tony Bland, and Quinn Gray

After a two-season absence as a coach, Joe was named head football coach at Miles College, an 
NCAA Division II school in Fairfield, Alabama on December 12, 2007. He resigned in October 2010, citing poor health. 
Assistant coach Patrick Peasant took over the team on an interim basis.

He finished his college coaching career with a record of 245–157–4. His number of victories are second only to Eddie Robinson among coaches at historically black colleges and universities.

Head coaching record

See also
 List of college football coaches with 200 wins

References

External links
 
 

1940 births
Living people
American football running backs
American Football League players
Buffalo Bills players
Central State Marauders football coaches
Cheyney Wolves football coaches
Denver Broncos (AFL) players
Florida A&M Rattlers football coaches
Miami Dolphins players
Maryland Terrapins football coaches
Miles Golden Bears football coaches
New York Jets players
Philadelphia Eagles coaches
Villanova Wildcats football players
Villanova Wildcats men's track and field athletes
American Football League All-Star players
American Football League Rookies of the Year
College Football Hall of Fame inductees
Athletes (track and field) at the 1963 Pan American Games
Pan American Games medalists in athletics (track and field)
Pan American Games silver medalists for the United States
Medalists at the 1963 Pan American Games
People from Aynor, South Carolina
People from Coatesville, Pennsylvania
Coaches of American football from Pennsylvania
Players of American football from Pennsylvania
Track and field athletes from Pennsylvania
African-American coaches of American football
African-American players of American football
African-American male track and field athletes
20th-century African-American sportspeople
21st-century African-American sportspeople